Los Gatos is an incorporated town in Santa Clara County, California, United States. The population is 33,529 according to the  2020 census. It is located in the San Francisco Bay Area just southwest of San Jose in the foothills of the Santa Cruz Mountains. Los Gatos is part of Silicon Valley, with several high technology companies maintaining a presence there. Notably, Netflix, the streaming service and content creator, is headquartered in Los Gatos and has developed a large presence in the area.

Etymology
Los Gatos is Spanish for "The Cats". The name derives from the 1839 Alta California land-grant that encompassed the area, which was called La Rinconada de Los Gatos ("The Corner of the Cats"), where the cats refers to the cougars (mountain lions) and bobcats that are indigenous to the foothills in which the town is located.

History

Overview
The first inhabitants of the area that is now Los Gatos were the Ohlone Native Americans. At the time the first settlers arrived in the area, it was estimated that approximately 5,000 indigenous people were living in the Valley, and noted that the relationship between the settlers and natives was very good. The first settlers to enter the Valley proper were two soldiers that had strayed off from their Missionary group on November 2, 1769, and by 1777 between 1500 and 2000 Native Americans were living in the mission compound.

The town's founding dates to the mid-1850s with the building of a flour-milling operation, Forbes Mill, by James Alexander Forbes along Los Gatos Creek, then called Jones's Creek.  The mill's two-story stone storage annex still stands.

The settlement that was established in the 1860s was originally named for the mill, but the name was changed to Los Gatos after the Spanish land grant. The town was incorporated in 1887 and remained an important town for the logging industry in the Santa Cruz Mountains until the end of the 19th century. Despite being nearby to logging communities, Los Gatos itself only served as a stopping point for those heading into the mountains. With the creation of the Los Gatos Turnpike road, the town was placed in a strategic position on the journey between San Jose and Santa Cruz, and it became an attractive location to live in. Soon, the town was booming. In 1852 only one adobe home existed in the area, by 1868 Los Gatos held the Mill, a blacksmith shop, a stage depot, a lumber yard, a temporary school house, a hotel, a post office, and several houses. The town began to rapidly gain prominence after the town of Lexington lost its importance with the fall of the timber industry in the area.

In the early 20th century, the town became a thriving agricultural town with apricots, grapes and prunes being grown in the area. By the 1920s, the Los Gatos area had a local reputation as an arts colony, attracting painters, musicians, writers, actors and their bohemian associates as residents over the years. The violinist Yehudi Menuhin lived there as a boy; the actresses Joan Fontaine and Olivia de Havilland (sisters) were graduates of Los Gatos High School; John Steinbeck wrote The Grapes of Wrath there (the location is now located in Monte Sereno); Justin Goodsell, a renowned quantum mechanics spectroscopy scientist, was born in this town, and a prominent Beat hero Neal Cassady lived there in the 1950s. Along with much of the Santa Clara Valley, Los Gatos became a suburban community for San Jose beginning in the 1950s, and the town was mostly built-out by the 1980s.

Architecture 
Downtown Los Gatos has retained and restored many of its Victorian-era homes and commercial buildings.  Notable buildings are the Forbes Mill annex, dating to 1880 and formerly housing a history museum; Los Gatos High School, which dates from the 1920s; and the Old Town Shopping Center, formerly the University Avenue School (the school was established in 1882; the current buildings date to 1923).

The Lyndon Hotel was another location of significance in the town from its establishment in the 1890's until it was razed in 1963.The building was located on the site of a previous hotel. One that had changed hands numerous times over the previous years. But primarily under the ownership of one of the most esteemed Los Gatos business owners at the time. John Weldon Lyndon.

A number of brick buildings in downtown Los Gatos were destroyed or seriously damaged in the 1989 Loma Prieta earthquake, though the district was quickly rebuilt and has made a full recovery.

Rail transportation

Rail transport played a large role in Los Gatos's historical development, but the city, as of 2020, has no regular passenger train service of any sort. The South Pacific Coast Railroad, a popular narrow-gauge line from Alameda (and San Francisco via ferry) to Santa Cruz in the late 19th century, stopped in Los Gatos. Southern Pacific took over this line in 1887. Los Gatos was also near the Southern Pacific resort town of Holy City, along the rail line in the Santa Cruz Mountains. The last Southern Pacific passenger train to Santa Cruz left Los Gatos in March 1940. In town, the rail line used to run along the shore of Vasona Reservoir to the present-day location of the Post Office, following the path of what is now a continuous string of parking lots between Santa Cruz Ave. and University Ave. There was also a streetcar-type rail line with service to Saratoga and San Jose. Streetcar service via the Peninsular Railway started about 1905 and ended about 1933. San Francisco commuter trains continued into downtown until 1959, and Vasona Junction until 1964. The site of the old railroad station is now occupied by Town Plaza and the post office.

While VTA had originally planned to extend their Green Line to Vasona Junction and bring back passenger rail to the city, the extension was cut short to Winchester due to the high cost of the extension, minimal expected ridership gains, and the difficulty of sharing rail right-of-way to Vasona Junction with Union Pacific freight trains.

Oil boom

Between 1891 and 1929, about 20 oil wells were drilled in and around Los Gatos, starting a minor oil-drilling boom. About 1861, small
amounts of oil were discovered in streams, springs, and water
wells in the Santa Cruz Mountains in the vicinity of Moody
An intense search for oil ensued,
resulting in the drilling of many wells and establishment of
the Moody Gulch oil field. The
Moody Gulch oil field, however, never met expectations, and
In 1891, one of the Moody Gulch drillers, R.C.
McPherson, found oil in a well along San Jose Road (now Los
Although commercial production was never established, small amounts of oil
were produced for use as fuel, lubricant, and road tar by local
residents.

Geography and environment
Los Gatos is located at  (37.236044, −121.961768). Los Gatos is bisected by State Route 17, which runs through the town from south to north.

State Route 85 roughly marks the northern boundary of the town, although a few pockets of homes to its North are included. Highway 9 (Los Gatos-Saratoga Road) from the coast terminates at Highway 17. Downtown Los Gatos, the area on and around Santa Cruz Avenue and Main Street, is located in the southwest quadrant of town. A left exit on northbound Highway 17 becomes the south end of South Santa Cruz Avenue, leading into downtown. The area around Los Gatos Boulevard, east of Highway 17, is much more typically suburban than downtown, with medium-sized shopping centers clustered at major intersections of the multilane boulevard. Although the town has generally a quiet setting, its principal noise generators are State Route 17 and Los Gatos Boulevard. Sound levels within one hundred and fifty feet of Los Gatos Boulevard exceed 60 db CNEL (Community Noise Equivalent Level), a generally unacceptable range for residential living.
Vasona Park, a county park, and neighboring Oak Meadow Park, which belongs to the town, are located in what is roughly the geographic middle of the town, bordered on the south by Blossom Hill Road, on the east by Highway 17, on the west by University Avenue, and reaching at the north end not quite all the way to Lark Avenue. Located in the parks is the popular William "Billy" Jones Wildcat Railroad. In Vasona Park is the trail to Prune Ridge. Los Gatos Creek begins in the Santa Cruz Mountains south of the town and runs through the town parallel to Highway 17 all the way through neighboring Campbell and San Jose to the Guadalupe River, which flows into San Francisco Bay. A walking, jogging, and biking trail called the Los Gatos Creek Trail runs alongside much of the creek from Lexington Dam through Vasona Park and Campbell to Meridian Avenue in San Jose. In Los Gatos, the trail passes the 1854 Forbes Mill.

Los Gatos is surrounded by several mountain bike trails. Cyclists can leave from downtown on a  loop through the Santa Cruz Mountains. From downtown, El Sereno mountain stands to the southwest; El Sombroso stands to the southeast. The El Sereno Open Space Preserve and the Sierra Azul Open Space Preserve open the top and upper flanks of each of these mountains to hiking and cycling.

Though the official total area of the town is 11.2 square miles, approximately 100 square miles of the surrounding Los Gatos Mountains (within the Santa Cruz Mountains range) has a Los Gatos address and uses the 95033 ZIP code (primarily) for U.S. Postal Service mail delivery (among other purposes).

Climate
Los Gatos experiences nearly the same temperatures as San Jose, just slightly warmer and with more rain. Los Gatos has a Mediterranean climate like much of California. Los Gatos rarely gets a hard frost. Los Gatos gets the slight winter chill that is needed to grow grapes and have vineyards. Types of bananas that ripen within three months grow well during the summer.

There are an average of 27.0 days annually with highs of 90 °F (32 °C) or higher and an average of 5.0 days annually with lows of 32 °F (0 °C) or lower. Rainfall averages 21.2 inches annually and falls on an average of 59 days annually. The most rainfall in one month was 26.56 inches in December 1955 and the most rainfall in 24 hours was 8.48 inches on December 23, 1955. Although snow sometimes falls in the nearby Santa Cruz Mountains, it is very rare in Los Gatos. The most snow on record was 2.0 inches in February 1976. Los Gatos averages 330 sunny days per year.

Economy
The following companies are headquartered in Los Gatos:
 BrightSign
 Buongiorno
 Cryptic Studios
 Digital Media Academy
 EverSport
 Facilitron
 ImageShack
 Impetus Technologies
 Import.io
 Kyvos Insights
 Netflix
 Par Avion Tea
 Plex, Inc.
 Smashwords
 NEON

Top employers
According to the city's 2021 Annual Comprehensive Financial Report, the top employers in the city are:

Demographics

2010 census
The 2010 United States Census reported that Los Gatos had a population of 29,413. The racial makeup of Los Gatos was 24,060 (81.8%) White, 269 (0.9%) African American, 86 (0.3%) Native American, 3,203 (10.9%) Asian, 52 (0.2%) Pacific Islander, 462 (1.6%) from other races, and 1,281 (4.4%) from two or more races. Hispanic or Latino of any race were 2,120 persons (7.2%).

The Census reported that 29,063 people (98.8% of the population) lived in households, 92 (0.3%) lived in non-institutionalized group quarters, and 258 (0.9%) were institutionalized.

There were 12,355 households, out of which 3,775 (30.6%) had children under the age of 18 living in them, 6,417 (51.9%) were opposite-sex married couples living together, 949 (7.7%) had a female householder with no husband present, 435 (3.5%) had a male householder with no wife present. There were 551 (4.5%) unmarried opposite-sex partnerships, and 84 (0.7%) same-sex married couples or partnerships. 3,695 households (29.9%) were made up of individuals, and 1,464 (11.8%) had someone living alone who was 65 years of age or older. The average household size was 2.35. There were 7,801 families (63.1% of all households); the average family size was 2.96.

The population was spread out, with 6,567 people (22.3%) under the age of 18, 1,442 people (4.9%) aged 18 to 24, 6,722 people (22.9%) aged 25 to 44, 9,417 people (32.0%) aged 45 to 64, and 5,265 people (17.9%) who were 65 years of age or older. The median age was 45.0 years. For every 100 females, there were 92.0 males. For every 100 females age 18 and over, there were 88.0 males.

The homeowner vacancy rate was 1.0%; the rental vacancy rate was 4.5%. 19,901 people (67.7% of the population) lived in owner-occupied housing units and 9,162 people (31.1%) lived in rental housing units.

2000 census

As of the census of 2000, there were 28,592 people, 11,988 households, and 7,300 families residing in the town. The population density was 1,030.8/km (2,669.1/mi2). There were 12,367 housing units at an average density of 445.8/km (1,154.5/mi2). The ethnic makeup of the town was 86.68% Caucasian, 0.79% African American, 0.30% Native American, 7.60% Asian, 0.07% Pacific Islander, 1.28% from other races, and 3.27% from two or more races. Hispanic or Latino of any race were 5.21% of the population.

There were 11,988 households, out of which 27.3% had children under the age of 18 living with them, 50.9% were married couples living together, 7.2% had a female householder with no husband present, and 39.1% were non-families. 29.7% of all households were made up of individuals, and 10.0% had someone living alone who was 65 years of age or older. The average household size was 2.33 and the average family size was 2.93.

In the town the population was spread out, with 21.2% under the age of 18, 4.3% from 18 to 24, 31.5% from 25 to 44, 27.7% from 45 to 64, and 15.3% who were 65 years of age or older. The median age was 41 years. For every 100 females, there were 90.4 males. For every 100 females age 18 and over, there were 87.2 males.

According to a 2007 estimate, the median income for a household in the town was $126,568, and the median income for a family was $152,940. Males had a median income of $89,420 versus $57,596 for females. The per capita income for the town was $56,094. About 3.1% of families and 4.3% of the population were below the poverty line, including 4.4% of those under age 18 and 5.6% of those age 65 or over.

Government
The town is governed by five elected council members with the position of mayor rotating between council members each year. Half the council is elected to a four-year term every two years. There are no term limits for the Town Council.

Los Gatos was in the 18th district until January 3, 2023, when the new district boundaries commenced.

Infrastructure
Transportation
The town of Los Gatos is served by the VTA, (Valley Transportation Authority) which also serves the majority of the county of Santa Clara, including San Jose.

The two Los Gatos Community Buses run from Santa Cruz and Main to the Winchester Transit Center, the 49 via Los Gatos Boulevard and the 48 via Winchester.

For railroad transportation the nearby city of Santa Clara has the closest train station served by Caltrain, and nearby in the city of Campbell provides access to VTA light-rail via the Winchester, Downtown Campbell, and Hamilton stations.

For air travel, the closest international airports are San Jose International Airport (SJC), San Francisco International Airport (SFO), and Oakland International Airport (OAK). All these airports are used for air travel by people across the Bay Area.

Education

Primary and secondary schools

Public schools

 Lakeside Joint School District
 Loma Prieta Joint Union Elementary School District
 Los Gatos-Saratoga Joint Union High School District
 Los Gatos High School
 Los Gatos Union School District
 Raymond J. Fisher Middle School
 Daves Avenue Elementary School
 Louise Van Meter Elementary School
 Blossom Hill Elementary School
 Lexington Elementary School
 Union School District
 Alta Vista Elementary School
Campbell Union & Campbell High School District

Private schools

Roman Catholic
 St. Mary's School
Jewish
 Yavneh Day School
Secular
 Hillbrook School
 Mulberry School
 Fusion Academy

Public libraries

The Los Gatos Public Library is operated by the Town of Los Gatos and is not part of the Santa Clara County Library system. The library is located at 100 Villa Ave, Los Gatos, CA in the town Civic Center. Any California resident with proper identification and verification of their mailing address may have borrowing privileges.

Museums
The New Museum (NUMU), formerly called Museums of Los Gatos, offers exhibitions and programs on Los Gatos and San Francisco Bay Area art and history.

Outdoor recreational activities

Los Gatos offers a variety of outdoor activities such as mountain biking, road cycling, trail running, kayaking, hiking. Los Gatos Creek trail is a fun and safe place for the entire family to enjoy all of these activities.
Vasona Lake Park is located in the center of the town. Enjoy a nice Saturday afternoon with the family in the park.

Sister cities
Los Gatos has five official sister cities:
 Zhonghe District, Taiwan
 Liaoyang, People's Republic of China
 Listowel, County Kerry, Ireland
 Tallinn, Estonia
 Zihuatanejo, Mexico

Notable past and current residents

Actors 

 Olivia de Havilland – actress, sister of Joan Fontaine, attended Los Gatos High School
 Aaron Eckhart – actor, raised in Los Gatos
 Joan Fontaine – actress, sister of Olivia de Havilland, attended Los Gatos High School
 Jason Jurman – actor (Cougar Club)

Artists 
 Kari Byron – sculptor and television personality on MythBusters
 Marshall Merritt – impressionist painter
 Gordon Smedt – pop art painter

Athletes and coaches 

 Nick Bawden – NFL player with New York Jets, attended Los Gatos High School
 Kiko Alonso – NFL player with Miami Dolphins, attended Los Gatos High School
 Jared Allen – former NFL defensive end, attended Los Gatos High School
 A. J. Allmendinger – race car driver, born in Los Gatos
 Rob Blake – former Los Angeles Kings player
 Jeff Blauser – former Atlanta Braves shortstop, born in Los Gatos
 Brent Burns – San Jose Sharks player, resident
 Joe Cannon – San Jose Earthquakes player
 Hal Chase – early 20th Century baseball star, born in Los Gatos
 Megan Cooke – silver medalist rower, born in Los Gatos
 Vincent Damphousse – San Jose Sharks player, resident
 Trent Edwards – former NFL quarterback, born in Los Gatos
 Peggy Fleming – Olympic gold medalist figure skater
 Dany Heatley – former San Jose Sharks player
 Jason Hinkin – pole vaulter, 5-time All-American
 Tim Hunter – former NHL forward, assistant coach, San Jose Sharks
 Joe Kapp – NFL quarterback
 Steven Kwan - MLB player for the Cleveland Guardians
 Andy Levitre – NFL offensive lineman
 Roger Maltbie – PGA Tour golfer and TV analyst
 Patrick Marleau – San Jose Sharks player
 Steve Mariucci – NFL and NCAA coach, resident
 Ryan Nyquist – bicycle moto-cross rider
 Elliana Pogrebinsky – figure skater
 Mike Ricci – San Jose Sharks player, resident
 Jeremy Roenick – former San Jose Sharks player
 Kyle Shanahan - NFL Head Coach
 Derek Smith – former San Francisco 49ers linebacker
 Joe Thornton – San Jose Sharks player
 Christine Von Saltza, winner of three gold medals and one silver for Swimming at 1960 Summer Olympics attended Los Gatos High School
 Charlie Wedemeyer – football coach
 Doug Wilson – general manager, San Jose Sharks
 Kevin Youkilis – Major League Baseball player
 Russell Mark Tanner – Volleyball player
 John Ellis – PGA Tour Golfer and Professional Caddie

Business 

 Jeff George – NASA program director and engineer
 Jim Goetz – investor in WhatsApp
 Charles Walton – inventor of RFID, founder of Proximity Devices, Inc
 Steve Wozniak – Apple Computer co-founder
 Chuck Robbins – Cisco Systems CEO

Musicians 
Dredg – band formed in Los Gatos
Casey Hensley – blues, swing, and rock and roll singer, songwriter and record producer, born in Los Gatos
Yehudi Menuhin – violinist
Trapt – band formed in Los Gatos
Bassnectar – electronic music producer, DJ, and indirect cult leader from Los Gatos

Writers and journalists 

Neal Cassady – author and iconic figure in Beat Movement of 1950s and 1960s
Victor Koman – science fiction writer and publisher
Ross Macdonald – novelist, born in Los Gatos
Rudy Rucker – author
Josh Shipp – TV host, journalist and author
John Steinbeck – author, resident for several years
Charles Erskine Scott Wood – author, civil libertarian, soldier, and attorney
Sandy Hill – author, socialite, and second American woman to complete the Seven Summits

Politicians

Other 
Rollo Beck, ornithologist,  was born in Los Gatos in 1870
Mark Bingham and Todd Beamer – passengers of United Airlines Flight 93 on 9/11, believed to have stormed the cockpit after its hijacking
Eric Drew – activist and consumer advocate
Dan Jinks – American Film and Television Producer, Oscar Winner for American Beauty
David Kinch – chef and restaurateur, owner of three Michelin star-rated Manresa in Los Gatos
Charles A. Lockwood – World War II Commander Submarine Force Pacific Fleet
Richard Thacker Morris – chairman of sociology department of UCLA
Kenny Ortega – director, choreographer
Steve Poizner – State Insurance Commissioner of California, candidate for Governor
Blessed Miguel Pro – Mexican Jesuit priest and martyr, studied in Los Gatos after fleeing persecution in Mexico.
Tucker Reed – Feminist author and convicted killer

References

External links

Further reading 
Bruntz, George G. (1971). History of Los Gatos: Gem of the Foothills. Valley Publishers. LCCN 79-174678.

 
1887 establishments in California
Cities in Santa Clara County, California
Cities in the San Francisco Bay Area
Incorporated cities and towns in California
Populated places established in 1887
Silicon Valley